Hoff is a surname. Notable people with the surname include:

August Bernhard Carl Hoff (1886–1971), Lutheran pastor of Koonibba Mission in South Australia
Benjamin Hoff, American author whose works are influenced by Taoism
Bobby Hoff, American professional poker player
Charles Hoff (1902–1985), Norwegian athlete, coach, sports journalist, novelist and sports administrator
Chet Hoff, American baseball pitcher
Christian Hoff, American actor
Ebbe Hoff, American doctor who researched into neurology, substance abuse and diving medicine
Edwin H. Hoff (1921-2007), American politician
Elke Hoff (born 1957), German politician (FDP)
Gustav A. Hoff (1852–1930), American politician
Hans Hoff (1897–1969) Austrian psychiatrist and neurologist
William Cooper (novelist), known as Harry Hoff, English novelist
Karl Hoff (1838-1890), German painter
Katie Hoff, American swimmer
Marcian Hoff, American co-inventor of the microprocessor and Intel executive
Max Hoff, German sprint kayaker
Philip H. Hoff (1924–2018), American lawyer and Governor of Vermont
Rayner Hoff, Australian sculptor
Ron van der Hoff, Dutch Olympic archer
Susan Dew Hoff, American physician
Susanna Hoffs, American musician
Syd Hoff, American children's author and cartoonist
Thomas Hoff, 2006 Olympic volleyball gold medalist

See also
Hof (surname)
von Hoff surname
Van 't Hof, a Dutch surname
Jacobus Henricus van 't Hoff, Dutch winner of the first Nobel Prize in chemistry

Surnames from status names